Kharkhorin is a town and sum (district) center in Övörkhangai Province in Mongolia. The sum population was 13,828 (1994), 13,964 (2000), and 14,765 (2017). The population of Kharkhorin town itself was 14,765 in 2017 and covered an area of 20.5 km2.

Kharkhorin is located at the lower end of the upper valley of the Orkhon River which is included within UNESCO's World Heritage Site  Orkhon Valley Cultural Landscape. The location marks the easternmost foothills of the Khangai Mountains, where they meet the rolling steppe of central Mongolia.

Nearby are the ruins of the ancient town of Karakorum (also known as Kharkhorum or Qara Qorum) which, for a short time, served as the capital of the Mongol Empire under Ogedei Khan. Another Kharkhorin landmark is Erdene Zuu monastery and its famous phallic rock.  The important Paleolithic archaeological site of Moiltyn-am is located near the bridge over the Orkhon River, just west of the settlement.  A modern resort is south of Kharkhorin at Khujirt on the Orkhon River.

Kharkhorin's principal sources of income are tourism and agriculture. Water from the Orkhon River serves to irrigate crops on the large plain east of the town. The Kharkhorin Airport (KHR/ZMHH) has one unpaved runway and is served by regular flights from and to Mongolia's capital, Ulan Bator.

Climate
Kharkhorin has a dry-winter warm-summer continental climate (Köppen Dwb).

References
 PADCO: Mongolia Urban Development and Housing Sector Strategy, Final Report, Vol. 2, 2005 

Populated places in Mongolia
Districts of Övörkhangai Province